Xinyang Normal University (XYNU) is located in Xinyang city with famous cultural and historical interests in the south of Central China's Henan province.

History

Founded in 1975, XYNU was a sub-college in Xinyang City belonging to  Kaifeng Teachers' College (the origin of Henan University). In 1998, XYNU was authorised by the State Council of China to award MA degrees.

Academics

School of Politics and Law 
School of Literature 
School of Life Sciences 
School of Education Science 
School of Chemistry＆ Chemical Engineering 
School of Continuing Education 
Huarui College 
School of Economics ＆Management 
School of Physics＆ Electronic Engineering 
School of Mathematics ＆ Information Science
Department of Mass Communication
Department of Physical Education
Department of Music 
Department of History 
Department of Fine Arts 
Foreign Languages Department 
Department of Architectural Engineering
Department of English Teaching and Research 
Urban and Environmental Science Department 
Department of Marxism Teaching ＆ Research
Department of Computer Science and Technology

Glory

In 2007, XYNU was entitled Excellent University in the national education evaluation program.

In 2009, XYNU was nominated National Role Model in Ethical and Cultural Progress.

'XYNU is the cradle of prospective teachers', said Mr Fei Xiaotong, the famous social activist and educationist.

See also

Maojian tea
Xinyang city
Fei Xiaotong

References

External links
Official Website of XYNU

Education in Xinyang
Education in Henan
Teachers colleges in China
Universities and colleges in Henan
Educational institutions established in 1975
1975 establishments in China